The Ambergris Caye Limestone is a geologic formation in Belize. It preserves fossils dating back to the Late Pleistocene period.

See also 
 List of fossiliferous stratigraphic units in Belize

References

Further reading 
 S. J. Mazzullo. 2006. Late Pliocene to Holocene platform evolution in northern Belize, and comparison with coeval deposits in southern Belize and the Bahamas. Sedimentology 53:1015-1047

Geology of Belize
Pleistocene Belize
Limestone formations
Reef deposits